The Fantastica Mania 2015 event was a series of six professional wrestling events in Japan, co-produced by the Japanese promotion New Japan Pro-Wrestling (NJPW) and the Mexican promotion Consejo Mundial de Lucha Libre (CMLL) and took place between January 13 and 19, 2015. The 2015 shows were the fifth time that NJPW and CMLL have co-promoted shows in Japan under the Fantastica Mania name. The 2015 event featured six shows in total, one more than the Fantastica Mania 2014 series, and the most shows of any year to date. The 2015 show was the first time the joint show will be held in Takamatsu and Kyoto while it had previously held shows in both Tokyo and Osaka.

Background
The events featured six to eight professional wrestling matches on each event. The 2015 Fantastica Mania series of shows were the fifth year in a row where Japanese wrestling promotion New Japan Pro-Wrestling (NJPW) has promoted a series of shows in Japan along with their Mexican partner promotion Consejo Mundial de Lucha Libre (CMLL). The 2015 series of shows were show 13 through 18, a total of 6 shows, the highest number of any year up until that point. The show in Takamatsu, Japan on January 14 will be the first time Fantastiamaniac takes place in Takamatsu. In the summer of 2014 Bárbaro Cavernario won the 2014 2014 version of the En Busca de un Ídolo ("In search of a Idol") tournament and as part of winning the tournament he was guaranteed participation in the 2015 Fantastica Mania series of matches. When CMLL and NJPW made the announcement of the six dates in 2015 they also announced Bárbaro Cavernario and Último Guerrero as the first two Mexican competitors for the series of shows. On November 21 CMLL announced the full field of 17 CMLL wrestlers going to Japan; Atlantis, La Sombra, Volador Jr., Místico, Gran Guerrero, Mr. Niebla, Máscara Dorada, Pólvora, Mephisto, Okumura, Ángel de Oro, Stuka Jr., Rey Cometa, Tritón and Stigma. The 2015 tour would be the first time that Bárbaro Cavernario, Gran Guerrero, Mr. Niebla, Pólvora, Ángel de Oro, Tritón and Stigma would work the Fantastica Mania events; and also the first year that Máximo would not be on the Fantastica Mania shows. On December 12, it was announced that NJPW wrestlers Hiroshi Tanahashi, Shinsuke Nakamura, Tetsuya Naito and Kazuchika Okada would also be taking part in the tour. The full cards for all six events were released on January 6, 2015.

Results

January 13

January 14

January 15

January 17

January 18

January 19

See also
2015 in professional wrestling

References

2015 in Tokyo
2015 in professional wrestling
2015
January 2015 events in Japan